Microstoma is a genus of pencil smelt.

Species
There are currently 2 species in this genus:
 Microstoma australis Gon & A. L. Stewart, 2014 (Slender smallmouth) 
 Microstoma microstoma A. Risso, 1810 (Slender argentine)

References

Microstomatidae
Ray-finned fish genera
Taxa named by Georges Cuvier